Ptychochromis is a genus of cichlids endemic to rivers and lakes in Madagascar. One species (P. grandidieri) can also be seen in brackish water. Most species in this genus are threatened, and P. onilahy is probably extinct. Most reach a length of 15 to 20cm, but P. insolitus reaches 25, while P. grandidieri and P. oligacanthus reach 35 and 20cm respectively.  The largest species was P onilahy which may have reached as much as 45cm if reports of fishermen are to be believed.

Species
There are currently 10 recognized species in this genus:

 Ptychochromis curvidens Stiassny & Sparks, 2006
 Ptychochromis ernestmagnusi Sparks & Stiassny, 2010
 Ptychochromis grandidieri Sauvage, 1882
 Ptychochromis inornatus Sparks, 2002
 Ptychochromis insolitus Stiassny & Sparks, 2006
 Ptychochromis loisellei Stiassny & Sparks, 2006
 Ptychochromis makira Stiassny & Sparks, 2006
 Ptychochromis mainty C. M. Martinez, Arroyave-Gutiérrez & Sparks, 2015
 Ptychochromis oligacanthus (Bleeker, 1868)
 Ptychochromis onilahy Stiassny & Sparks, 2006

Additionally, cichlid from the eastern Anosy Region in far southeastern Madagascar may actually represent an undescribed species, popularly known as Ptychochromis sp. "Manampanihy".

References

 
Ptychochrominae
Cichlid genera
Taxa named by Franz Steindachner
Taxonomy articles created by Polbot